Cyclorama is the fourteenth studio album by Styx, released in 2003. This was the first studio album with Lawrence Gowan, following the departure of group co-founder Dennis DeYoung in 1999. It was also the latter of two albums to feature Glen Burtnik (the former being 1990's Edge of the Century), and the only album released by the Lawrence Gowan/Tommy Shaw/James "JY" Young/Glen Burtnik/Chuck Panozzo/Todd Sucherman lineup, and as such the only original Styx album to feature four different singer-songwriters (Shaw, Young, Gowan and Burtnik) as opposed to the usual three. The album peaked significantly higher on the Billboard album charts than Styx's previous release, Brave New World (1999), ending up 48 slots higher at No. 127.

The album's first single was "Waiting for Our Time," which failed to chart on the Top 40 singles chart.  It charted on the Mainstream Rock and Heritage Rock charts.  "Yes I Can" charted on the American Music Adult Contemporary Chart.

The album was also released as a "Dual Disc," with the reverse side of the disc containing a 5.1 DVD-Audio mix as well as music videos.  The album was finally released to streaming services in 2020.

Track listing
All credits adapted from the original release.

Personnel
Styx
 Tommy Shaw – vocals, acoustic and electric guitars, mandolin
 James "JY" Young – vocals, electric guitars
 Lawrence Gowan – vocals, keyboards
 Glen Burtnik – vocals, electric and upright bass, synth bass on "Genki Desu Ka", 12 string guitar on "Together"
 Chuck Panozzo – bass on "Bourgeois Pig", backing vocals on "Kiss Your Ass Goodbye"
 Todd Sucherman – drums, percussion, loops, synth bass on "Do Things My Way", vocals

Additional personnel
 Jude Cole
 Gary Loizzo of American Breed
 Tenacious D (Jack Black and Kyle Gass)
 Billy Bob Thornton
 John Waite
 Brian Wilson

Production
 Producers: Tommy Shaw, James "JY" Young, Gary Loizzo
 Associate producers: Lawrence Gowan, Todd Sucherman, Glen Burtnik
 Engineers: Gary Loizzo, Charlie Pakaari, Craig Williams, Mark Linnett, Plinky Giglio, Dave Yackoboskie, Jimmy Hoyson, Jim Mitchell, Bruce Monical

Charts
Album - Billboard (United States)

Singles - Billboard (United States)

References

External links
 Styx - Cyclorama (2003) album review by Greg Prato, credits & releases at AllMusic.com
 Styx - Cyclorama (2003) album releases & credits at Discogs.com
 Styx - Cyclorama (2003) album credits & user reviews at ProgArchives.com

2003 albums
CMC International albums
Albums with cover art by Storm Thorgerson
Styx (band) albums